Bertram Luiz Leupolz Airport  is the airport serving Sorocaba, Brazil.
 
It is operated by Rede Voa.

History
The airport was commissioned in 1942.

On March 5, 2012, the government of São Paulo state announced the concession of an area of the airport to Embraer. The latter plans to build and develop a service center of executive aviation in the new facility. Embraer considers the airport an ideal location because it is located only 90 km away from São Paulo downtown.

On July 15, 2021 the concession of the airport was auctioned to Rede Voa, under the name Consórcio Voa NW e Voa SE. The airport was previously operated by DAESP.

Airlines and destinations
No scheduled flights operate at this airport.

Access

See also

List of airports in Brazil

References

External links

Airports in São Paulo (state)
Airports established in 1942
Sorocaba
1942 establishments in Brazil